Barengapara is a village in West Garo Hills district of Meghalaya state in India.

See also 
 West Garo Hills district

References 

Villages in West Garo Hills district